Sergey Safin is a Russian Boccia player, who won bronze medal in the Mixed pairs BC4 event at the 2020 Summer Paralympics.

References

External links 

 Tokyo, Japan, August 30th 2021, Tokyo 2020 Paralympic games, Boccia tournament. Sergey Safin - Alamy

Living people
Medalists at the 2020 Summer Paralympics
Paralympic bronze medalists for the Russian Paralympic Committee athletes
Year of birth missing (living people)